Karel Pešek (born 2 August 1992) is a Czech motorcycle racer. He races in the Alpe Adria Road Racing Superstock 1000 Championship aboard a Kawasaki ZX-10R. He has previously competed in the Alpe Adria Superstock 600 Championship, the FIM Superstock 1000 Championship and the European Superstock 600 Championship. He won the Czech 125cc Championship in 2008 and the Czech Superstock 600 Championship in 2011. His brother, Lukáš Pešek, is also a motorcycle racer.

Career statistics

Grand Prix motorcycle racing

By season

Races by year
(key) (Races in bold indicate pole position; races in italics indicate fastest lap)

Superbike World Championship

Races by year
(key) (Races in bold indicate pole position; races in italics indicate fastest lap)

References

External links
 Profile on MotoGP.com
 Profile on WorldSBK.com

1992 births
Living people
Sportspeople from Prague
125cc World Championship riders
Czech motorcycle racers
FIM Superstock 1000 Cup riders
Superbike World Championship riders